The GA engine is a 1.3 to 1.6 L inline-four piston engine from Nissan. It has a cast-iron block and an aluminum head. There are SOHC and DOHC versions, 8, 12, and 16 valve versions, carbureted, single-point, and multi-point injected versions, and versions with variable valve timing (GA16DE). The GA was produced from August 1987 through 2013. Since 1998, it was only available from Mexico in the B13.

In the code of the engine, the first two initials indicate engine class, the two numbers indicate engine displacement (in decilitres), the last two initials indicate cylinder-head style and induction type (D=DOHC, S=carburetor, E=injection). In the case of a single-initial suffix, the initial indicates induction type.

GA13

GA13S

The GA13S is a SOHC  engine, carbureted, with 12 valves.

GA13DS

The GA13DS is a DOHC  engine with a carburetor.

Applications: 
1990 Nissan Sunny
1993 Nissan Sentra B13 series in LEC model (Philippines).
1998 Nissan Sentra B14 series in FE model (Philippines).
1994 Nissan AD

GA13DE

The GA13DE is a  engine with DOHC and electronic gasoline injection. It was used in the 1995-1999 Nissan Sunny.

GA14

GA14S

The GA14S is a  engine, SOHC, carbureted, with 12 valves. It was used in the B12 Sentra and the N13 Sunny/Sentra. Compression ratio is 9.4:1.

GA14DS

The GA14DS is a  16V DOHC engine with carburetor and a 9.5:1 compression ratio. Redline is at 6500 rpm. Catalyzed models come with electronically controlled carburetors. In this version the most common problem is the air/fuel ratio solenoid in the carburetor.

Applications:
 1990-1998 Nissan Sunny N14
 1990-1994 Nissan Sunny B13 (Export models)
 1992-1995 Nissan Sentra B13 Series JX and EX models (Philippines).
 1996-1997 Nissan Sentra B14 series EX models (Philippines).

GA14DE

The GA14DE is a  16V DOHC fuel injection engine. The bore x stroke is the same as for other GA14 family engines: . Redline is at 7200 rpm.

Applications:
 1992-1995 Nissan Sunny N14
 1996-2000 Nissan Sentra B14 series EX models (Philippines)
 1999 Nissan Sentra (South Africa)
 1995-2001 Almera/Pulsar N15

GA15

GA15S

The GA15S is a SOHC  engine, carbureted, with 12 valves.

GA15DS

The GA15DS is a  16V DOHC engine with a carburetor.

Applications:

 1990-1993 Nissan Sunny
 1990-1993 Nissan Pulsar
 1990-1994 Nissan NX Coupé (JDM)
 1990-1997 Nissan Wingroad & AD van.

GA15E

The GA15E is a  multi point fuel injected SOHC engine. It was used in the Nissan Pulsar, including such models as the 1988 X1-E Milano (JDM).

GA15DE

The GA15DE is a  engine with DOHC and electronic throttle-body fuel injection. It was introduced in December 1993 and uses Nissan's ECCS engine control system admission.

Applications:
 1995-1998 B14 Nissan Sunny
 1995-2000 N15 Nissan Pulsar/Nissan Lucino, R11 Nissan Presea (JDM)
 1994-2000 Nissan Rasheen
 1995-1999 Y10 Nissan Wingroad/Nissan AD Van
 1997-1999 Subaru Leone Van (rebadged Y10)
 1997-1999 Mazda Familia Van (rebadged Y10)

GA16

GA16S

The GA16S has twelve valves, solid valve rockers, and is fitted with a carburetor. It produces  (without a catalyst). For some markets, such as South Africa, there was also an eight-valve version which produces  at 5500 rpm.

GA16E

The GA16E is a  multi-point fuel injected SOHC engine. It produces .

GA16i

The GA16i is a  throttle-body fuel-injected engine produced from August 1987 through June 1990, which produces .

Applications:
 1989-1990 Nissan Sentra
 1989-1990 Nissan Pulsar

GA16DE

The GA16DE is a  engine produced from November 1990 through 1999. All GA16DEs have sixteen valves and a DOHC head. The two variants of the North American NVCS engine are distinguished as such: in addition to differences in the intake manifolds and (resultantly) the heads, earlier motors used pistons with two compression rings and a single oil ring and put out five less horsepower, while later GA16DEs have a single compression ring and a single oil ring. The GA16DE shares its block and crankshaft with its predecessor, the GA16i; however, their timing chain covers, connecting rods and pistons are altogether different. It is possible to interchange connecting-rod/piston assemblies between the GA16i and GA16DE with no danger to the valve train. Some engines have siamesed exhaust manifolds, while others keep the exhausts separated until the catalytic converter. Earlier ECUs contained the fuel & ignition maps on a discrete ROM IC, making retuning relatively easy, later ECUs buried the maps on a larger more integrated microcontroller's firmware, making retuning require the use of a daughterboard.

Applications:
 1993-1996 Nissan NX1600 B13
 1991-1994 Nissan Sentra B13
 1994-1995 Nissan 100NX B13 (UK)
 1991-1994 Nissan Presea R10
 1995-1999 Nissan Sentra B14
 1995-1999 Nissan 200SX B14
 1995-1999 Nissan Almera N15
 1990-1999 Nissan Pulsar N14/N15
 1993-1999 Nissan Primera P10/P11
 10/1992-07/1995 Nissan Sunny Traveller N14 / Nissan Wingroad Y10
 1999-2001 Nissan Exalta Philippines
 1995-1999 Nissan Vanette Cargo.

GA16DS
The GA16DS is a  carbureted only engine with a 16-valve DOHC head. Models equipped with a catalyst use the electronically controlled carburetor. Without catalyst: .

Applications
 1990-1993 Nissan Primera P10
 1990-1993 Nissan Sunny N14
 1990-1993 Nissan 100NX B13
 1990-1997 Nissan Avenir Cargo
1992-1996 Nissan Bluebird U13

Also fitted to the Nissan Sentra B13 from Japan, called EX Saloon.

GA16DNE

The GA16DNE is a Mexican-specification  engine, which produces . The main differences between the DE and DNE are: the DNE has no VTC and no ECCS plenum. The DNE has a vertical throttle body with an MAF inside; the air filter is diagonally oriented in its air filter housing. This variant also was released in some southeast Asian models (Philippine and Malaysian Sentra B14s)

The "N" in its nomenclature means "New EGI" (emission system), meaning this engine does not have an EGR system like the GA16DE.

Since 2003, the DNE variant comes with a new ECU and 3 oxygen sensors.

Applications:
 1998-2004 Nissan Tsubame Y10 (Mexico)
 1996-2000 Nissan Sentra B14
 1998-2011 Nissan Tsuru B13
 1998-2002 Nissan Sentra N14 (South Africa)
 1998-2002 Nissan Sabre N14 (South Africa)
 1996-1999 Nissan Sentra B14 (Philippines)
 1995-1999 Nissan Serena C23 (European)
The 1996-2000 sentra B14 chassis (super saloon, super touring, and GST) used the GA16DNE

See also
 List of Nissan engines

References

External links
 Nissan Sunny Owners Club 
 The FIRST official forum for the GA16 series motor

GA
Straight-four engines
Gasoline engines by model